The 1931–32 National Football League was the 5th staging of the National Football League, a Gaelic football tournament for the Gaelic Athletic Association county teams of Ireland.

Kerry won their fourth league in a row.

Format 
There were four divisions – Northern, Southern, Eastern and Western. Division winners played off for the NFL title.

Division One

Group A

Table

Group B (Munster Football League)

Group C

Table

Group D

Table

Knockout stage

Semi-finals

Final

Division two

Midland Section

Southern
Kilkenny scratched v Carlow

Northern

Final

Northern Section

Table

References

National Football League
National Football League
National Football League (Ireland) seasons